Mondragone is a comune or municipality in the Province of Caserta in the Italian region of Campania.

History
In the Middle Ages, it was occupied by the Normans who built (or re-built) a castle.

Main sights
Ruins of  Sinuessa Cellole & Sessa Aurunca
Torre del Paladino, a 1st-century BC mausoleum
Rocca or castle, built between the 8th and the 9th centuries. It was later modified by the Aragonese
Monastery of Sant'Anna al Monte
Sanctuary of the Belvedere (c. 13th century)

References

External links
 Official website

 

Cities and towns in Campania
Castles in Italy